Kim Joon-hyung (born 5 April 1996) is a South Korean football midfielder who plays for Bucheon 1995 FC.

Career Statistics

Clubs

References

External links
Kim Joonhyung – National Team Stats at KFA 

1996 births
Living people
Association football defenders
South Korean footballers
Suwon Samsung Bluewings players
K League 1 players